Courier is the first live recording and sixth album by Richard Shindell.  It includes many of his most popular originals from previous recordings, a cover of Lowell George's classic song, "Willin'", and what has been described as a "near-holy reading" of Bruce Springsteen's "Fourth of July, Asbury Park".

Signature Sounds also offered a limited number of bonus EP's titled The Sonora Sessions, which included an additional seven tracks.

Courier

Track listing 
All songs written by Richard Shindell, except where noted.
"The Courier"  4:51
"Memory of You" – 4:28
"Next Best Western" – 4:17
"Willin'" (Lowell George) – 3:15
"The Kenworth of My Dreams" – 4:05
"Nora" – 4:42
"Arrowhead" – 5:07
"Reunion Hill" – 4:24
"Fishing" – 4:33
"A Summer Wind, A Cotton Dress" – 4:04
"On a Sea of Fleur de Lis" – 4:47
"The Ballad of Mary Magdalen" – 5:11
"Are You Happy Now?" –  4:10
"Transit" – 7:32
"Fourth of July, Asbury Park" (Bruce Springsteen) – 6:35

Recorded by Ben Wisch and Ron Schreier at the Emelin Theatre (Mamaroneck, NY) 3/16 and 17, 2001. Tracks 3 and 11 recorded at the Outpost in the Burbs (Montclair, NJ) on 2/2/01. Track 7 recorded at Bailey Building & Loan (Greenwich Village, NYC). Mixed by Ben Wisch.

Personnel 
Musicians:
 Richard Shindell – guitar and vocals
 Lucy Kaplansky – harmony vocals
 Dennis McDermott – drums
 John Putnam – electric guitar, tiple
 Lincoln Schleifer – bass

and on tracks 3 and 11:
 Greg Anderson – bouzouki, guitar, cittern
 Lisa Gutkin – violin
 Radoslav Lorković – accordion

on "Reunion Hill"
 Larry Campbell – violin

Other credits:
 David Glasser – Mastering
 Toby Goldberg – Project Coordinator
 Ron Schreier – Engineer, Live Recording Coordination
 Ben Wisch – Engineer, Mixing
 Carol Young – Project Coordinator

The Sonora Sessions

Track listing 
"Confession"  – 5:00
"Abeulita"  – 4:08
"You Stay Here"  – 5:00
"Wisteria"  – 5:23
"Johnny Star Intro"  – 0:42
"Sonora's Death Row" (Kevin Blackie Farrell) – 4:19
"Sonora's Death Row II"  – 3:15

Notes and references 

Richard Shindell albums
2002 live albums